Outlander is a historical drama television series based on the Outlander novel series by Diana Gabaldon. Developed by Ronald D. Moore, the show premiered on August 9, 2014, on Starz. It stars Caitríona Balfe as Claire Randall, a former Second World War military nurse in Scotland who, in 1945, finds herself transported back in time to 1743. There she encounters, falls in love with and marries a dashing Highland warrior named Jamie Fraser (Sam Heughan), a tacksman of Gabaldon's fictionalized version of Clan Fraser of Lovat. Here, Claire becomes embroiled in the Jacobite rising.

The 16-episode first season of the television series (released as two half-seasons) is based on the first novel in the series, Outlander. The second season of 13 episodes, based on Dragonfly in Amber, aired from April to July 2016. The 13-episode third season, based on Voyager, aired from September to December 2017. The 13-episode fourth season, based on Drums of Autumn, aired from November 2018 to January 2019. The fifth season of 12 episodes, based on The Fiery Cross, aired from February to May 2020. The sixth season of 8 episodes, based on A Breath of Snow and Ashes, aired from March to May 2022. The upcoming seventh season which consists of 16 episodes, is based on An Echo in the Bone and is set to premiere in mid-2023.

By February 2022, development had begun on a prequel series titled Outlander: Blood of My Blood, which will focus on Jamie Fraser's parents Brian and Ellen Fraser. In January 2023, Outlander: Blood of My Blood was officially confirmed for a ten-episode first season, and Outlander was renewed for a ten-episode eighth and final season.

Plot

Season 1 (2014–2015)
In 1945, Claire Randall, who had formerly served as a nurse in the British Army during the Second World War and her husband Frank are visiting Inverness, Scotland, when she is carried back in time to 1743 by the standing stones at Craigh na Dun (in what is now Tay Forest Park). She falls in with a group of rebel Highlanders from Clan MacKenzie (a fictionalization of the real Clan MacKenzie), who are being pursued by government troops led by Captain Jonathan "Black Jack" Randall. Randall turns out to be Frank's ancestor.

Clan MacKenzie suspect her of being a spy, but retain her as a healer, which prevents her from attempting to return to her own time. Knowing that the Jacobite cause is doomed to fail, she tries to warn them against rebellion. Out of necessity Claire marries a Highlander, Jamie Fraser, but they quickly fall in love. Her husband Jamie is captured, tortured, and raped by the sadistic Randall, but Claire and his clansmen rescue him. Claire tells Jamie that she is pregnant and they set sail for the Kingdom of France.

Season 2 (2016)
In 18th century Paris, Claire and Jamie try to thwart the Jacobites by subverting the funds that King Louis XV of France is likely to provide. Jamie becomes the confidant of Charles Stuart, but the Frasers fail to prevent the risings. Randall reappears in Paris, but Claire makes Jamie swear to keep him alive until Frank's descent is assured. She achieves this by convincing Randall to marry Mary Hawkins. Claire and Jamie's daughter Faith is stillborn, and she and her 18th century husband return to Scotland. The Jacobites win the Battle of Prestonpans. Jamie and Claire also adopt a young French boy named Claudel, who Jamie renames Fergus.

Before the Battle of Culloden, Jamie convinces Claire, pregnant again, to return to the 20th century. Jamie decides to die fighting at Culloden with his clan. Back in her own century, Claire tells Frank about her time travel. He asks her to forget Jamie and let him raise her child as his own. Twenty years later, Frank has died in a car accident. Claire takes her 20-year-old daughter Brianna to Scotland. Claire discovers that Jamie did not die at Culloden and vows to return to him.

Season 3 (2017)
Jamie kills Randall at Culloden and is gravely injured, but spared execution. At Ardsmuir prison, he befriends the governor, Lord John Grey, who later paroles him to work at an English estate. There, Jamie is manipulated into a sexual liaison and fathers an illegitimate son, William. Jamie returns to Scotland and becomes a printer.

In 1968, Claire enrolls in medical school in Boston, Massachusetts. Frank is killed in a car accident while Brianna is in college. With the help of Roger Wakefield, Claire finds clues to Jamie's fate after Culloden. She returns to the 18th century and discovers Jamie has married a widowed Laoghaire. Claire's return nullifies their union as illegal. They try to retrieve some hidden treasure so that he can placate Laoghaire with a settlement, but Jamie's nephew Ian is captured by pirates and taken to the Caribbean. Jamie and Claire follow and manage to rescue him from Geillis, who had escaped burning at the stake in season one. Claire and Jamie sail for Scotland, but are shipwrecked on the coast of Georgia.

Season 4 (2018–2019)
In the Province of North Carolina, Claire and Jamie seek to return to Scotland with Fergus, Marsali and Ian. They visit a plantation owned by Jamie's aunt Jocasta Cameron, where they encounter Black slaves. Claire and Jamie decide to leave and claim land that they name Fraser's Ridge, which is already inhabited by Cherokee. Jamie reunites with Murtagh, now a blacksmith and leader of the Regulator Movement. Lord John visits with Jamie's son, Willy.

In the 1970s, Brianna rejects Roger's marriage proposal. After learning her parents will die in a fire, Brianna travels through the stones. When Roger discovers Brianna has left, he follows her. They meet in Wilmington, North Carolina and enter into handfast marriage. Shortly after, they get into an argument and Roger leaves. In his absence, Stephen Bonnet rapes Brianna. She reunites with her mother and finally meets her biological father, Jamie. Brianna discovers she is pregnant. Roger goes to Fraser's Ridge, where Brianna's maid Lizzie, wrongly assumes that he is the rapist. Lizzie informs Jamie, who beats Roger. Young Ian sells Roger to the Mohawk. Discovering their mistake, they set off to rescue Roger and Ian trades his freedom for Roger's. Roger and Brianna are reunited at Jocasta's plantation and Jamie receives instructions to kill Murtagh, who is a fugitive.

Season 5 (2020)
Jamie and Claire fight to retain their home at Fraser's Ridge as the American Revolutionary War looms on the horizon. Brianna and Roger marry and Governor Tryon further pushes Jamie to hunt down Murtagh, forcing Jamie to gather up a militia and counteract the Regulators. He struggles to balance keeping his godfather safe and fulfilling his duties to the British, especially under the eye of Lieutenant Knox, who is determined to find and kill Murtagh. Despite Murtagh's pleas for Jocasta to return his love for her, she moves forward with her fourth marriage, choosing the safety and security of her plantation's future over his idealism. Jamie's loyalties are pushed to the breaking point at the Battle of Alamance, when Roger's attempt to warn Murtagh fails and Murtagh is shot dead. Roger is captured and mistakenly hanged by the British; he survives, but is left traumatized by the experience. Jamie is left devastated in the months following the battle.

Meanwhile, Roger and Bree's relationship is put to the test as there are signs of Stephen Bonnet's reappearance, forcing Brianna to take matters into her own hands when she is captured by him. Eventually, Bree and Roger decide to go back through the stones when they realize Jemmy can too, as the future will be much safer for their son. Their attempt fails and the two, taking this as a sign of fate, decide to stay at Fraser's Ridge, along with their large family. Young Ian returns from his time with the Mohawk and learns the truth about Claire, Brianna and Roger's origins when he confronts them with information passed to him by the Mohawk. Claire continues to subvert conventional medical practices by producing penicillin and covertly providing medical advice under a pseudonym, but her subversive advice backfires on her. Claire is abducted and gang raped by Lionel Brown and his men, but is subsequently rescued by Jamie, Fergus, Roger, and the other men of the Ridge. Though Jamie returns Lionel's body to Richard, Lionel's brother and mayor of Brownsville, Richard subtly threatens Fraser's Ridge and Jamie's family.

Season 6 (2022)
The political unrest in the colonies begins to boil over and the Frasers (Jamie, Claire, Brianna, and Roger) try to peacefully live on their isolated homestead in the foothills of North Carolina. Jamie is suddenly faced with walking between the fires of loyalty to the oath he swore to the British Crown and following his hope for freedom in the new world. Trouble continues with the Browns as they form 'a committee of safety' that threatens the peace on the ridge dividing a wedge between the Native Americans, the British and the Frasers. In the meantime the Christie family arrive on the Ridge, a throwback to Jamie's time in Ardsmuir Prison and begin to influence the harmony on the Ridge. Malva Christie, the daughter of Tom Christie takes a liking to Claire only to betray her in announcing her pregnancy with Jamie as the father. The season ends with a huge amount of unrest involving the Browns and the Christie's as Jamie and Claire's grip on Fraser's Ridge becomes ever more fragile.

Cast and characters

 Caitríona Balfe as Claire Fraser
 Sam Heughan as James "Jamie" Fraser
 Tobias Menzies as Frank Randall (seasons 1–4) and Jonathan "Black Jack" Randall (seasons 1–3)
 Graham McTavish as Dougal MacKenzie (seasons 1–2, 7) and William "Buck" MacKenzie (season 5)
 Duncan Lacroix as Murtagh Fitzgibbons Fraser (seasons 1–5)
 Grant O'Rourke as Rupert MacKenzie (seasons 1–3)
 Stephen Walters as Angus Mhor (seasons 1–2)
 Gary Lewis as Colum MacKenzie (seasons 1–2)
 Lotte Verbeek as Geillis Duncan  Gillian Edgars (seasons 1–3, 7)
 Bill Paterson as Edward "Ned" Gowan (seasons 1, 3)
 Simon Callow as Clarence Marylebone, Duke of Sandringham (seasons 1–2)
 Laura Donnelly as Janet "Jenny" Fraser Murray (seasons 1–3)
 Douglas Henshall as Taran MacQuarrie (season 1)
 Steven Cree as Ian Murray (seasons 1–4, 7)
 Stanley Weber as Le Comte St. Germain (season 2)
 Andrew Gower as Prince Charles Edward Stuart (seasons 2–3; guest season 6)
 Rosie Day as Mary Hawkins (season 2)
 Dominique Pinon as Master Raymond (season 2)
 Frances de la Tour as Mother Hildegarde (season 2)
 Nell Hudson as Laoghaire MacKenzie (seasons 2–4, 7; recurring season 1)
 Clive Russell as Simon Fraser, Lord Lovat (season 2)
 Richard Rankin as Roger MacKenzie (season 2–present)
 Sophie Skelton as Brianna "Bree" Fraser MacKenzie (season 2–present)
 David Berry as Lord John Grey (seasons 3–present)
 John Bell as Ian Fraser Murray (season 3–present)
 César Domboy as Fergus Claudel Fraser (season 3–present)
 Lauren Lyle as Marsali MacKimmie Fraser (season 3–present)
 Richard Dillane as Captain Raines (season 3)
 Edward Speleers as Stephen Bonnet (seasons 4–5)
 Maria Doyle Kennedy as Jocasta MacKenzie Cameron (season 4–present)
 Colin McFarlane as Ulysses (seasons 4–5)
 Natalie Simpson as Phaedre (season 4)
 Tantoo Cardinal as Adawehi (season 4)
 Caitlin O'Ryan as Lizzie Wemyss (season 4–present)
 Braeden Clarke as Kaheroton (seasons 4, 6)
 Gregory Dominic Odjig as Satehoronies (season 4)
 Billy Boyd as Gerald Forbes (seasons 4–5)
 Carmen Moore as Wahkatiiosta (season 4)
 Tom Jackson as Tehwahsehwkwe (seasons 4, 6)
 Yan Tual as Father Alexandre Ferigault (season 4)
 Sera-Lys McArthur as Johiehon (season 4)
 Chris Larkin as Richard Brown (season 5–present)
 Ned Dennehy as Lionel Brown (seasons 5–6)
 Mark Lewis Jones as Tom Christie (season 6–present)
 Glen Gould as Chief Bird (season 6–present)
 Simon R. Baker as Still Water (season 6–present)
 Gail Maurice as Tsotehweh (season 6)

Production

Development

In July 2012, it was reported that Sony Pictures Television had secured the rights to Gabaldon's Outlander series, with Moore attached to develop the project and Jim Kohlberg (Story Mining and Supply Co) producing. Sony completed the deal with Starz in November 2012, and Moore hired a writing team in April 2013. That June, Starz picked up the Outlander project for a sixteen-episode order, and in August it was announced that John Dahl would be directing the first two episodes. Starz CEO Chris Albrecht later said that he had green-lit several genre projects, including Outlander, to shift the network's series development toward "audiences that were being underserved" to "drive a real fervent fan base that then becomes the kind of advocacy group for the shows themselves".

Calling it "a different kind of show than has ever been on, in my memory", Albrecht believed that Outlanders combination of fantasy, action, a strong central romance and a feminist focus would set it apart. Another distinguishing feature of the show is its use of Scottish Gaelic. Àdhamh Ó Broin is the language consultant and Griogair Labhruidh sang in Gaelic on the second season's soundtrack.

On August 15, 2014, after only the pilot episode had aired, the network renewed the series for a second season of at least thirteen episodes, based on the second book in Gabaldon's series, Dragonfly in Amber. On June 1, 2016, Starz renewed the series for a third and fourth season, which adapt the third and fourth Outlander novels, Voyager and Drums of Autumn.

On May 9, 2018, Starz renewed the series for a fifth and sixth season, which adapt The Fiery Cross and A Breath of Snow and Ashes, respectively and each season to consist of twelve episodes.

On March 14, 2021, the series was renewed for a seventh season, originally to consist of 12 episodes and adapt the seventh novel, An Echo in the Bone. On June 1, 2021, Starz announced the sixth season would premiere in early 2022 with a shortened eight-episode season, while the seventh season would consist of 16 episodes. On November 22, 2021, Gabaldon announced that the sixth season would premiere on March 6, 2022. In January 2023, the series was renewed for an eighth and final season to consist of 10 episodes.

Writing
Moore said of the pilot: "There's a lot of things we did in the first thirty to forty minutes that aren't in the book or are compilations of things that happened in the book". He emphasised that he did not want to present the time-travel dimension in a traditional special effects-laden science fiction manner. Describing the adaptation of the first season as "straightforward", he explained: "it was always kind of clear what the basic structure was: Claire's trying to get home, then she meets this guy, now she's falling in love, now she has a conflict, will she go home. You lay it out in a very linear fashion". Regarding the darker tone of the season's second half, he said: "the show becomes more complicated and the emotional journey more wrenching".

Regarding the second season and the source novel Dragonfly in Amber, Moore said:

Gabaldon was employed as consultant to the TV production. When asked in June 2015 about the adaptation of the first season, she said: "I think they did condense it very effectively ... I ended up getting most of the things that I felt strongly about in there. There were only a few instances where the most important stuff in my opinion didn't get in". In March 2015, she said of the scripts for season two: "The Parisian stuff is very good and in fact I'm deeply impressed by the outlines I've seen ... I think they've done a wonderful job of pulling out the most important plot elements and arranging them in a convincing way". Gabaldon wrote the screenplay for the episode "Vengeance is Mine".

According to Moore, the writing and pre-production for season four began while season three was still in active production. Gabaldon wrote an episode for the fifth season.

Casting

On July 9, 2013, it was announced that Sam Heughan had been cast as Jamie Fraser, the male lead. Tobias Menzies was the second actor cast, on August 8, in dual roles of Frank and Jonathan Randall. Stephen Walters and Annette Badland were announced in the recurring roles of Angus Mhor and Mrs. Fitzgibbons on August 29, 2013, with Graham McTavish and Gary Lewis announced as the MacKenzie brothers on the September 4. Series female lead Claire Beauchamp Randall was to be portrayed by Caitríona Balfe as announced on September 11, 2013. The series later added Lotte Verbeek as Geillis Duncan and Laura Donnelly as Jamie's sister Jenny in October 2013.

In December 2013, Simon Callow was cast in the supporting role of Duke of Sandringham, and Entertainment Weekly reported in April 2014 that Steven Cree would portray Ian Murray. Bill Paterson was cast as lawyer Ned Gowan in June 2014. Author Gabaldon has a cameo as Iona MacTavish in the August 2014 episode "The Gathering". In August 2014 it was announced that Frazer Hines had been cast in the role of a prison warden in an episode to air in 2015. From 1966 to 1969, Hines had portrayed the Doctor Who character Jamie McCrimmon, who Gabaldon said had inspired the setting of the Outlander series and the character of Jamie Fraser. Hines plays Sir Fletcher Gordon, an English prison warden, in the May 2015 episode "Wentworth Prison".

In June 2015, the series cast Andrew Gower as the Jacobite pretender Prince Charles Edward Stuart; Robert Cavanah as Jamie's Scottish cousin Jared, a wine merchant and Jacobite living in Paris; Margaux Châtelier as Annalise de Marillac, Jamie's French ex-lover; and Laurence Dobiesz as Alex Randall, Black Jack's younger–and gentler–brother. Other cast added for season 2 include Romann Berrux as the French pickpocket Fergus, Rosie Day as the baronet's daughter Mary Hawkins, Stanley Weber as Le Comte St. Germain, Dominique Pinon as healer Master Raymond, Marc Duret as French Minister of Finance Joseph Duverney, Frances de la Tour as Mother Hildegarde, and Audrey Brisson as Sister Angelique. In July 2015, Lionel Lingelser was cast as King Louis XV of France. Moore revealed in June 2015 that Verbeek would be returning in the role of Geillis. Richard Rankin was cast as Roger Wakefield in December 2015, while Sophie Skelton was chosen to portray Brianna Randall, Claire and Jamie's daughter, in January 2016.

In August 2016, Starz announced that David Berry had been cast as Lord John William Grey for season three. In September, Wil Johnson was cast as Joe Abernathy and John Bell as "Young Ian" Fraser Murray. In October, César Domboy was cast as an adult Fergus and Lauren Lyle as Laoghaire's daughter Marsali MacKimmie. Hannah James and Tanya Reynolds were cast as sisters Geneva and Isobel Dunsany in November 2016.

In October 2017, two season four roles were announced. Maria Doyle Kennedy was cast as Jamie's aunt, Jocasta and Ed Speleers as Stephen Bonnet, an Irish pirate and smuggler. The casting of Colin McFarlane as Jocasta's slave butler Ulysses was announced in January 2018. The Cherokee and Mohawk people in seasons four and five were portrayed by members of First Nations from Canada who traveled to Scotland for the filming.

In May 2020, Berry announced that he would not be returning to Outlander for the sixth season. Nevertheless, he made a guest appearance in one episode in season six.

In May 2022, it was announced that Canadian actor Charles Vandervaart had been cast to play William Ransom, Jamie's son who was raised by Lord John Grey since season three. In October 2022, it was confirmed that Graham McTavish, Nell Hudson, Steven Cree and Lotte Verbeek would reprise their roles in the seventh season.

Filming
In July 2013, British Chancellor of the Exchequer George Osborne confirmed that the production would benefit from the Creative Sector Tax Relief programme implemented in the UK in 2012, which extends film tax reliefs to high-end television productions. The Scottish government also agreed to help pay for the conversion of a warehouse complex on the outskirts of Cumbernauld in North Lanarkshire into a film studio. Principal photography began on location in Scotland in September 2013. The Cumbernauld studios were used for on set filming, with location shoots taking place at Doune Castle, Stirling; mills in East Linton, East Lothian; Newtonmore in the Scottish Highlands; Rothiemurchus Forest, Aviemore; quarries near Bathgate, West Lothian and Aberfoyle, Stirling, as well as Linlithgow Palace, Loch Rannoch in the Highlands and Falkland and Culross in Fife. Such settings have attracted substantial numbers of international tourists.

Filming for season two began in April 2015, to air in spring 2016. The primary setting for the season is Paris, which Moore explained is being recreated using other locations. Some interiors were filmed on the show's Scotland soundstages, while Prague was used for the exterior street scenes and the Palace of Versailles. In addition some palaces in the south of England which have French rooms and architecture were used as Parisian interiors and part of Versailles. Moore noted that season two of Outlander "will look completely different than season one" with a "richer, more dynamic kind of visual palette". With the change of setting from Scotland to France, he said that "visually you’ve moved from the heavy woods and stone of season 1 into the finery of the Parisian apartments". He explained:

Production on season three began in September 2016 in Scotland and filming took place in Cape Town from March to June 2017. Filming completed on June 16, 2017.

In August 2017, Moore said that for season four, locations in Scotland would double as 18th century America and some of the mountains and rivers of North Carolina would be recreated using locations in Eastern Europe. Production for season four was completed in Scotland by July 5, 2018.

Production on season five, set primarily in North Carolina, began in Scotland in April 2019. Locations included Kinloch Rannoch (for Craigh na Dun), the Thomas Coats Memorial Baptist Church in Paisley, 
The Hermitage, Dunkeld in Perthshire and Milne Woods in Bridge of Allan. Much of the filming was completed at Wardpark Studios in Glasgow.

Production on season six was scheduled to begin in May 2020, but was delayed due to the COVID-19 pandemic. Production eventually began in February 2021.

Production for season seven began in April 2022, while filming began in May 2022 in Scotland.

Music
The music is composed by Bear McCreary. The title song is an adaptation of Robert Louis Stevenson's poem Sing Me a Song of a Lad That Is Gone, set to the tune of the Scottish folk song "The Skye Boat Song". For the first half of season two, the second verse of the opening theme is sung in French to reflect the season's French setting. For the second half of season three, the second verse of the opening theme has Caribbean music to reflect the season's Jamaican setting. The fourth season opening theme has a colonial American sound.

Release
Outlander premiered in the United States on August 9, 2014. Its first eight episodes aired through September and the remaining eight episodes resumed in April 2015. The first-season finale aired on May 30, 2015.

Outlander debuted in Australia on SoHo on August 14, 2014, and began airing in Canada on Showcase on August 24, 2014. The series also premiered on October 21, 2014, in Ireland. In the United Kingdom, it was acquired by Amazon Prime Video, where it premiered on March 26, 2015 In April 2015, The Herald reported that emails leaked in the Sony Pictures Entertainment hack suggested that the broadcast delay in the UK may have been due to sensitivity about the September 2014 Scottish independence referendum.

The second season of 13 episodes premiered on April 9, 2016, and the 13-episode third season on September 10, 2017. The fourth season premiered on November 4, 2018, and the fifth on February 16, 2020. The sixth season premiered on March 6, 2022.

In New Zealand, Outlander was previously distributed by the video streaming service Lightbox. Following Sky's acquisition of Lightbox, Sky's  streaming service Neon acquired the distribution rights to Outlander in New Zealand.

Reception

Critical response

On Rotten Tomatoes, the average rating of the overall series is 89%, while on Metacritic it has an average rating of 76 out of 100.

Season 1
The first season received mostly positive reviews. On Metacritic, it has a rating of 73 out of 100, based on 34 reviews, indicating "generally favorable reviews".  On Rotten Tomatoes, the season has a 91% rating with an average rating of 7.95/10 based on 261 reviews. The website's critical consensus reads: "Outlander is a unique, satisfying adaptation of its source material, brought to life by lush scenery and potent chemistry between its leads".

The Huffington Post called the first episode "... A masterpiece of impressive depth ... It is amazing!" Entertainment Weekly gave the premiere an "A−" rating, writing that it was "sexy and smart and stirring". Matt Zoller Seitz of New York magazine also praised the series, calling it "defiantly its own thing: part romance-novel fantasy, part-time-travel story and part wartime drama (set across two time periods)". Sonia Saraiya of The A.V. Club gave the first six episodes an A, writing that it "does for 1743 Scotland what Downton Abbey does for 1912 England" and adding that "Outlander succeeds admirably ... it refuses to sit comfortably in any genre."

British reception was more mixed. In the first UK review, Siobhan Synnot of The Scotsman said "There has not been such a proud display of tartanalia since the opening of the 2014 Commonwealth Games". Alastair McKay of The Evening Standard quoted Saraiya's comparison with Downton Abbey, adding "[The comparison] is entirely correct. It is magical-mystical heuchter-teuchter cobblers." Euan Ferguson of The Observer called it "gorgeous drivel" and Thomas Batten of The Guardian stated "If you love the scenery, shifting allegiances and palace intrigue of [Game of Thrones], but find yourself wishing the pace were a little slower and that the sex scenes were filmed in a more pretentious manner with lots of slow pans and softer lighting, here's your show." Graeme Virtue noted "the rather languid pace of the opening episodes", but praised the show's "rare acknowledgment of the female gaze" in its treatment of sex scenes. The Daily Telegraph also made the Game of Thrones comparison, while The Independent stated "...yes, it's a time-travelling, wish-fulfilment fantasy, but it's done with such flair and attention to detail that it's impossible not to hop on board for the ride."

Season 2
The second season received universal acclaim. On Metacritic, it has a score of 85 out of 100 based on 11 reviews, indicating "universal acclaim". On Rotten Tomatoes, it reports a 92% rating with an average rating of 8.05/10 based on 234 reviews. The website consensus reads: "Outlander returns for a second addictive season of mystery and sweeping romance as Claire and Jamie take on Paris." Based on five episodes for review, Marah Eakin of The A.V. Club gave it a perfect "A" grade and wrote, "It's not just well-written and lovely to look at. It's downright immersive. ... Outlander feels important–even moreso in its second season."

Season 3
The third season also received universal acclaim. It has a Metacritic score of 87 out of 100 based on 6 reviews, indicating "universal acclaim". Rotten Tomatoes reports a 90% rating with an average rating of 7.95/10 based on 195 reviews. The website consensus reads: "Outlanders epic love story returns with the same strong storytelling and an added layer of maturity." Based on six episodes for review, Liz Shannon Miller of IndieWire gave it an "A"-grade review and wrote, "This is a show that's grown and matured since its initial premiere in ways that defied our initial expectations."

Season 4
The fourth season received mostly positive reviews. It has a Metacritic score of 71 out of 100 based on 6 reviews, indicating "generally favorable reviews". Rotten Tomatoes reports an 88% rating with an average rating of 7.15/10 based on 170 reviews. The website consensus reads: "Outlanders epic romance settles into a violent fourth season, planting its flag on the American frontier while treading on darker themes."

Season 5
The fifth season also received mostly positive reviews. It has a Metacritic score of 73 out of 100 based on 4 reviews, indicating "generally favorable reviews". Rotten Tomatoes reports an 86% rating with an average rating of 7/10 based on 142 reviews. The website consensus reads: "Outlanders romantic ardor doesn't burn as bright in this fifth season, but the Frasers remain an enthralling pair as they try to forge a home together."

Season 6
The sixth season has an 89% rating on Rotten Tomatoes with an average rating of 7.8/10 based on 9 reviews.

Ratings
The first eight episodes averaged more than 5.1 million multiplatform viewers. In July 2015, noting Outlander strong ratings, its "vocal online fandom and a slew of think pieces tied to its feminist twists on the action genre", Josef Adalian of Vulture credited Outlander as one of the series responsible for Starz's increased success against competitors like Showtime. On February 11, 2020, cable provider Comcast moved Starz from its base cable packages to an a la carte option. This occurred five days before the premiere of season five.

Accolades

Prequel series
In February 2022, it was reported that a prequel series was in works, with Matthew B. Roberts writing and executive producing. In May 2022, executive producer Maril Davis confirmed that the series would focus on the parents of Jamie Fraser. In August 2022, it was confirmed that the series will be titled Blood of My Blood. In January 2023, Starz ordered a 10-episode first season.

Notes

References

External links

 
 

Fiction set in 1743
Fiction set in 1945
2014 American television series debuts
2010s American drama television series
2020s American drama television series
American time travel television series
2010s American time travel television series
2020s American time travel television series
English-language television shows
Outlander (franchise)
Saturn Award-winning television series
Scottish Gaelic-language films
Serial drama television series
Starz original programming
Television shows based on American novels
Television series by Left Bank Pictures
Television series by Sony Pictures Television
Television series set in the 18th century
Television series set in the 1940s
Television shows set in France
Television shows set in Scotland
Television shows set in Edinburgh
Television shows filmed in the United Kingdom
Television shows filmed in the Czech Republic
Television shows filmed in South Africa
2010s American LGBT-related drama television series
2010s British LGBT-related drama television series
2020s American LGBT-related drama television series
2020s British LGBT-related drama television series